Carl S. Galbreath (April 15, 1927 – August 26, 2009) was an award-winning and all-star running back in the Ontario Rugby Football Union.

A graduate of North Carolina Central University, he was a star player in college, selected as an All-CIAA running back four years and a Little All-American twice. He played one year of football in Canada, 1950, with the Toronto Balmy Beach Beachers of the ORFU and it was a successful one. His team won the league championship, he was an all-star, and he won the Imperial Oil Trophy as MVP in the ORFU.

After his football days, Galbreath served with the Army in the Korean War, and later became a teacher and assistant principal. He was elected to the Central Intercollegiate Athletic Association Hall of Fame in 1995. He died on August 26, 2009.

References

1927 births
2009 deaths
American players of Canadian football
Sportspeople from Fayetteville, North Carolina
NC State Wolfpack football players
Ontario Rugby Football Union players
Toronto Balmy Beach Beachers players
Players of American football from North Carolina
United States Army personnel of the Korean War